Long Riston is a village in the East Riding of Yorkshire, England, in an area known as Holderness. It lies to the east of the A165 road which by-passes the village.

Long Riston, with the hamlet of Arnold, forms the civil parish of Riston.

The church dedicated to St Margaret was designated a Grade II* listed building in 1966 and is now recorded in the National Heritage List for England, maintained by Historic England.

The village is a commuter settlement for those working in Hull and Beverley. The village has one public house, The Micro Pig.

In 1823 Long Riston was a civil parish in the Wapentake and Liberty of Holderness. Population at the time was 361. Occupations included eight farmers, two blacksmiths, three grocers, two shoemakers, two tailors, two wheelwrights, a butcher, a bricklayer, a hawker, and the landlord of The Traveller public house. Two carriers operated between the village and Hull, and Beverley, twice weekly.

In 1872 land adjacent to Main Street was given for the establishment of a school. The school was completed in March 1873. Until the late 1950s it was known as Long Riston School and served both Long Riston and the hamlet of Arnold. Subsequently, it became known as Riston C E Primary School.  The school is a voluntary controlled church school in the diocese of York.

The church stands back from the road in fields at the north end of the village that show signs of medieval ridge and furrow farming and next to an area called Butt Hills that seems to hint at more history as these are in the right place for and carry the right name for medieval Archery Butts. Long Riston Archery Festival has been held yearly since 2013 in the  Medieval archery butts next to St Margaret's church, Long Riston.

References

External links

Villages in the East Riding of Yorkshire
Holderness